Kenneth Jackson may refer to:

Kenneth H. Jackson (1909–1991), linguist specializing in the Brythonic languages
Kenneth T. Jackson (born 1939), historian specializing in New York City
Kenny Jackson (born 1962), former professional American football player
Kenny Jackson (cricketer) (born 1964), former first class cricketer
Ken Jackson (trade unionist) (born 1937), British trades unionist
Ken Jackson (American football) (1929–1998), American football player
Ken Jackson (rugby league), rugby league footballer of the 1950s and 1960s for Great Britain, and Oldham
Kenneth A. Jackson, businessman in Baltimore, Maryland, with past connections to the illegal drug trade
Ken Jackson (baseball) (born 1963), former Major League Baseball player
Kenneth Jackson (sportsman), Scottish cricketer and rugby union player